

The Butterworth Westland Whirlwind was a 2/3 scale flying replica of the British Westland Whirlwind fighter aircraft of World War II that was built in the United States in the 1970s. The aircraft was based on the wings and horizontal tail of a Grumman American AA-1A modified and mated to an all-new fuselage. Power was provided by two Volkswagen air-cooled horizontally opposed four-cylinder engines with the result bearing only a passing resemblance to the real Whirlwind. Butterworth marketed plans in the late 1970s and early '80s, with at least 15 sets selling and at least three aircraft reportedly under construction by 1985.

Specifications

References
 
 
 

1970s United States sport aircraft
Homebuilt aircraft
Replica aircraft
Low-wing aircraft
Aircraft first flown in 1977
Twin piston-engined tractor aircraft